Badimo (Tswana badimo, literally "ancestors") is a name for the indigenous African Traditional Religion of Botswana & South Africa. Although the CIA Factbook currently states that four percent of Batswana are practitioners, in reality a great majority of Batswana follow at least some of the traditions deemed Badimo even if they are strong followers of another religion as well.

The term "Badimo", although usually translated as "ancestors" does not simply refer to people who are now dead, but rather to the "living dead". In the traditional African worldview, deceased ancestors continue to be present and are actively included in the daily life of individuals and tribes. In Botswana it is believed that when someone dies, they go to live in another place from where they will be watching over the living. It is believed that if one does something that displeases Badimo they may punish him. The punishment upon the individual may be an unsuccessful life, sickness, accidents or non achievement. In order to please Badimo one should visit the grave yard once in a while to ask for forgiveness, there must be a sacrifice offered to them.

Origin
Badimo originated from Batswapong ancestors and put in the hills of Tswapong. They are invisible and only heard by children and older people. They speak their own language and make violent wind sounds whenever they move. They aid people in health and can determine whether or not a person remains healthy or not with their presence. There were many cases of young boys who were kidnapped and returned, knowing the full Badimo language. These children are chosen to deal with the Badimo when the join future delegations. There are traditional ceremonies and rituals held every year before the first rains to thank the ancestors for the good yields of the past year. During these rituals, Bojalwa (traditional beer) is brewed and a beast is killed, cooked, and taken to the hills where the Badimo are hidden. The delegation would leave this food and come back later to discuss with the Badimo and collect the utensils. The delegation would tell the Badimo what the community felt about their lives. If the Badimo were satisfied, they would tell the delegation what their expectations were for the community.  
The Badimo also serve the purpose of notifying the next of kin about a death or if someone is dying.

Religious diversity
Badimo, among other traditional religions, is mixed in with the most dominant religion in Botswana, Christianity.  Only a small percentage of Botswanans practices pure Christianity. Majority of Batswana practice a form of Christianity that is influenced and mixed with traditional religious beliefs. It makes the religion equal to be a social and cultural aspect of their society.
With past population estimates made in 2014, there are approximately 2.2 million people in Botswana. Of that, there is estimated 63 percent identifying as Christian, 27 percent as "God", 8 percent as no religion, and 2 percent as the traditional indigenous Badimo. The majority having a dual religious practice, Christianity and traditional religious worship. While the Botswanan people met missionaries with open arms and were convinced to join this new religion at the time in a welcoming and comforting way it did not stop them from creating their own version of the new religion. For them, as a society, their religion was not only a way of life but a reflection of who they are as a people. To drop the traditional practices would mean they would give up their identity. Since they were on good terms with the new religion, it allowed them to integrate their social identity and customs to not only customize the religion but make it their own.

Health
In most traditional religions and even modern religions, health, and faith are complementary. This religious identity allows for a reduction in risk of HIV as well as calling for a need for further research in the field. Those who follow a religion are encouraging to practice premarital abstinence and marital fidelity as a way of HIV and AIDS prevention. There is a mentality, behind the larger groups of believers, following such safe practices that there is a societal decrease of the spread of sexually transmitted diseases. Botswana midwives practice a traditional form of delivering babies. They continuously use traditional herbs and rely heavily on worship. Religious practitioners and church healers also have the status to diagnose misfortune and physical ailments. Regardless of traditional or modern belief, citizens, including traditional midwives, doctors, and healers, all use modern medicine and technology if illnesses or other health issues seem too complicated to handle. “Traditional religious specialists may bring rain, diagnose misfortunes, or strengthen households against evil influences and witchcraft, using herbs, roots, and special medicines” Dingaka is a traditional doctor that have extensive knowledge of medicinal herbs and plants. No modern medicines can match the medicinal herbs used by Dingakas for centuries to heal and cure diseases. Dingakas also claim to have powers, such as: ordering lightning to strike people and fixing unsteady marriages. Those who wish to practice must register with the Botswana Dingaka Association.

Politics
Chiefs in the pre-colonial time willingly passed along their powers. This created a societal effect in terms of structure and culture. Following this was the Botswanan mentality of accepting help and finding resources beyond their traditional parameters. It explains why in health and religion why the people in Botswana are mostly open and receptive to outside help, which was not the case for many other societies at the time.

Values
Before colonial missionaries, Batswana worshipped Modimo, a Supreme Being. They believed that a being was responsible for creating humankind, animals, and nature. Their cosmology reflected a strong connection between people and the natural environment. One of the most important values held by Botswanans is Botho. Botho means highest respect, honor, and esteem that one holds for another human life. Members of the society are required to practice Botho. Other values in Botswanan society include democracy, development, self-reliance, and unity. There is also a strong value in Morero (consultations), to ensure peace in society. This process is at inter-personal, family, and community levels, where communities and government consult at the Kgotla.

Death
Most Batswana believe in a heaven, hell, and resurrection in a Christian context. People expect the dead to keep interest in their descendants, as ancestral spirits. People prefer to be buried in their home villages, even if they have not lived there for a long time. Funerals are very important and expensive events.

References

External links
 African Mythology Site page on Badimo
 Culture of Botswana - history, people, clothing, traditions, women, beliefs, food, customs, family
 Religion and expressive culture - Tswana
 Setswana mother tongue: Opportunities and challenges in Namibian schools
 Culture and Customs of Botswana
 Postcoloniality, Translation, and the Bible in Africa
 The State And The Social: State Formation in Botswana and its Precolonial and Colonial Genealogies
 The Wiley-Blackwell Companion to African Religions

Traditional African religions
Religion in Botswana